Aspergillus tabacinus is a species of fungus in the genus Aspergillus. It is from the Versicolores section. The species was first described in 1934.

Growth and morphology

A. tabacinus has been cultivated on both Czapek yeast extract agar (CYA) plates and Malt Extract Agar Oxoid® (MEAOX) plates. The growth morphology of the colonies can be seen in the pictures below.

References 

tabacinus
Fungi described in 1934